The 1939–40 New York Rangers season was the franchise's 14th season. With new coach Frank Boucher the Rangers finish in 2nd Place again with an impressive 27–11–10 record. In the semi-finals the Rangers beat the Boston Bruins in 6 games to advance to the 1940 Stanley Cup Finals. In the finals the Rangers won their first 2 games by scores of 2–1 and 6–2 at the Garden, before finishing the series on the road because of the circus. After dropping the first 2 games in Toronto the Rangers won a critical Game five 2–1 in overtime on Muzz Patrick's overtime goal. In Game 6 it would take overtime again as the Rangers won their 3rd Stanley Cup on Bryan Hextall's goal 2:33 into OT. Following the season the Rangers would celebrate buying out their lease at Madison Square Garden by burning the lease in the historic Stanley Cup, a move that would take on greater mystery in coming years.

Regular season

Season standings

Record vs. opponents

Schedule and results

|- align="center" bgcolor="white"
| 1 || 5 || @ Detroit Red Wings || 1 – 1 OT || 0–0–1
|- align="center" bgcolor="white"
| 2 || 11 || @ Toronto Maple Leafs || 1 – 1 OT || 0–0–2
|- align="center" bgcolor="#FFBBBB"
| 3 || 12 || Toronto Maple Leafs || 1–0 || 0–1–2
|- align="center" bgcolor="#FFBBBB"
| 4 || 16 || Chicago Black Hawks || 3–2 || 0–2–2
|- align="center" bgcolor="#CCFFCC"
| 5 || 18 || @ New York Americans || 3–1 || 1–2–2
|- align="center" bgcolor="#FFBBBB"
| 6 || 19 || Montreal Canadiens || 2 – 1 OT || 1–3–2
|- align="center" bgcolor="white"
| 7 || 23 || @ Montreal Canadiens || 1 – 1 OT || 1–3–3
|- align="center" bgcolor="white"
| 8 || 26 || @ Boston Bruins || 2 – 2 OT || 1–3–4
|- align="center" bgcolor="#CCFFCC"
| 9 || 28 || Detroit Red Wings || 4–1 || 2–3–4
|- align="center" bgcolor="#CCFFCC"
| 10 || 30 || @ Chicago Black Hawks || 7–2 || 3–3–4
|-

|- align="center" bgcolor="white"
| 11 || 2 || New York Americans || 1 – 1 OT || 3–3–5
|- align="center" bgcolor="#CCFFCC"
| 12 || 10 || Boston Bruins || 3–2 || 4–3–5
|- align="center" bgcolor="white"
| 13 || 14 || Detroit Red Wings || 2 – 2 OT || 4–3–6
|- align="center" bgcolor="#CCFFCC"
| 14 || 16 || @ Montreal Canadiens || 4–2 || 5–3–6
|- align="center" bgcolor="white"
| 15 || 17 || @ Detroit Red Wings || 0 – 0 OT || 5–3–7
|- align="center" bgcolor="#CCFFCC"
| 16 || 19 || Montreal Canadiens || 5–2 || 6–3–7
|- align="center" bgcolor="#CCFFCC"
| 17 || 23 || Chicago Black Hawks || 7–1 || 7–3–7
|- align="center" bgcolor="#CCFFCC"
| 18 || 25 || Toronto Maple Leafs || 4–1 || 8–3–7
|- align="center" bgcolor="#CCFFCC"
| 19 || 29 || Boston Bruins || 4–0 || 9–3–7
|- align="center" bgcolor="#CCFFCC"
| 20 || 31 || New York Americans || 5–2 || 10–3–7
|-

|- align="center" bgcolor="#CCFFCC"
| 21 || 2 || @ Boston Bruins || 6–4 || 11–3–7
|- align="center" bgcolor="#CCFFCC"
| 22 || 4 || @ New York Americans || 6–2 || 12–3–7
|- align="center" bgcolor="#CCFFCC"
| 23 || 7 || Detroit Red Wings || 3–0 || 13–3–7
|- align="center" bgcolor="#CCFFCC"
| 24 || 11 || Chicago Black Hawks || 5–3 || 14–3–7
|- align="center" bgcolor="#CCFFCC"
| 25 || 13 || @ Toronto Maple Leafs || 4–1 || 15–3–7
|- align="center" bgcolor="#FFBBBB"
| 26 || 14 || @ Chicago Black Hawks || 2–1 || 15–4–7
|- align="center" bgcolor="#CCFFCC"
| 27 || 18 || @ Montreal Canadiens || 1–0 || 16–4–7
|- align="center" bgcolor="#CCFFCC"
| 28 || 21 || Boston Bruins || 4–2 || 17–4–7
|- align="center" bgcolor="#CCFFCC"
| 29 || 23 || @ New York Americans || 5–3 || 18–4–7
|- align="center" bgcolor="#CCFFCC"
| 30 || 25 || Toronto Maple Leafs || 3–0 || 19–4–7
|- align="center" bgcolor="#CCFFCC"
| 31 || 28 || New York Americans || 4–2 || 20–4–7
|-

|- align="center" bgcolor="#FFBBBB"
| 32 || 1 || @ Detroit Red Wings || 2–0 || 20–5–7
|- align="center" bgcolor="#CCFFCC"
| 33 || 4 || Montreal Canadiens || 9–0 || 21–5–7
|- align="center" bgcolor="#FFBBBB"
| 34 || 6 || @ Boston Bruins || 6–2 || 21–6–7
|- align="center" bgcolor="#CCFFCC"
| 35 || 8 || Toronto Maple Leafs || 2–1 || 22–6–7
|- align="center" bgcolor="white"
| 36 || 10 || @ Toronto Maple Leafs || 4 – 4 OT || 22–6–8
|- align="center" bgcolor="#FFBBBB"
| 37 || 11 || @ Chicago Black Hawks || 3–0 || 22–7–8
|- align="center" bgcolor="#CCFFCC"
| 38 || 15 || Detroit Red Wings || 3–1 || 23–7–8
|- align="center" bgcolor="#FFBBBB"
| 39 || 18 || @ Detroit Red Wings || 2–0 || 23–8–8
|- align="center" bgcolor="#FFBBBB"
| 40 || 22 || @ New York Americans || 1 – 0 OT || 23–9–8
|- align="center" bgcolor="#CCFFCC"
| 41 || 24 || @ Montreal Canadiens || 2–0 || 24–9–8
|- align="center" bgcolor="#CCFFCC"
| 42 || 25 || Montreal Canadiens || 6–2 || 25–9–8
|- align="center" bgcolor="#FFBBBB"
| 43 || 29 || Chicago Black Hawks || 2–1 || 25–10–8
|-

|- align="center" bgcolor="white"
| 44 || 2 || @ Toronto Maple Leafs || 1 – 1 OT || 25–10–9
|- align="center" bgcolor="#CCFFCC"
| 45 || 3 || @ Chicago Black Hawks || 2–1 || 26–10–9
|- align="center" bgcolor="#CCFFCC"
| 46 || 10 || New York Americans || 4–2 || 27–10–9
|- align="center" bgcolor="#FFBBBB"
| 47 || 12 || @ Boston Bruins || 2–1 || 27–11–9
|- align="center" bgcolor="white"
| 48 || 14 || Boston Bruins || 0 – 0 OT || 27–11–10
|-

Playoffs

Stanley Cup Finals
The final series between the Rangers and the Maple Leafs was an exciting one that went back and forth with three overtime games. The Rangers took the first two at home and the Leafs took the next two in Toronto. 
The circus forced the Rangers to vacate Madison Square Garden after the first two games. The Rangers would score three game-winning goals in overtime, including the Cup winner. Lynn and Murray Patrick played for the Rangers, and became the third and fourth members of the Patrick family to win the Stanley Cup. Bryan Hextall scored in overtime in the final game to give the Rangers their 3rd Stanley Cup and last until .

Key:  Win  Loss

Player statistics
Skaters

Goaltenders

†Denotes player spent time with another team before joining Rangers. Stats reflect time with Rangers only.
‡Traded mid-season. Stats reflect time with Rangers only.

Awards and records
 Calder Memorial Trophy: Kilby MacDonald
 Vezina Trophy: Dave Kerr

References

External links
 Rangers on Hockey Database

New York Rangers seasons
New York Rangers
New York Rangers
New York Rangers
New York Rangers
1930s in Manhattan
1940s in Manhattan
Madison Square Garden
Stanley Cup championship seasons